Noceda may refer to:

Geography
 Noceda (river), a river in Province of León, in Castile and León, Spain
 Noceda del Bierzo, a village and municipality in the region of El Bierzo, in Province of León, Castile and León, Spain
 Noceda de Rengos, one of 54 parish councils in Cangas del Narcea, a municipality in Asturias, Spain

People
People with the surname Noceda include:
 Lunna (born 1960; María Socorro García de la Noceda), is a singer of popular music and jazz who was the director of the television
 Jorge Noceda Sánchez (1925–1987), diplomat and painter from the Dominican Republic
 Rubén Noceda (1931–2007), football goalkeeper from Paraguay

Fictional characters
 Luz Noceda, protagonist of the 2020 American animated series The Owl House

See also
 Noseda, people with a similar surname